Cobham, Virginia may refer to:
Cobham, Albemarle County, Virginia
Cobham, Surry County, Virginia